Wellington Phoenix Football Club Reserves is a football team based in Wellington, New Zealand. They currently serve as the reserve side of the Wellington Phoenix FC of the A-League and compete in the New Zealand National League.

History
From 2010 to 2013, a Wellington Phoenix reserve side took part in the ASB Phoenix Challenge competition against ASB Premiership sides, however these games were separate to the main competition.

On 22 August 2014 it was announced that the club had been granted permission to field a reserve side in the 2014–15 ASB Premiership, the highest level of football in New Zealand. The team made their debut in the competition on 1 November 2014 against Team Wellington. Tyler Boyd scored the first goal in the reserves' history, but that could not prevent them losing 1–2.

On 2 October 2015, Wellington Phoenix named a youth squad to take part in the ASB Youth League.

With the restructuring and creation of a new National League made by New Zealand Football for the 2021 season, a Memorandum of Understanding (MoU) was signed between the Phoenix and Lower Hutt City which saw the team play under in the Central League under the Lower Hutt banner. This meant Lower Hutt could not qualify for the Championship phase even if they finish in the top three of the Central League as Wellington Phoenix would then play that part of the competition.

This changed again for the 2022 season, with the Phoenix allowed to again play in the national league under their own name and colours.

Players

Reserves squad

Senior player appearances
Up to four professional players are eligible to play for the reserves side from this squad. Two under-20 players are also allowed if the reserves side's opposition agrees to their inclusion on match day.

Season by season record

References

External links
 Official website

 
Wellington Phoenix Reserves
Association football clubs established in 2014
Sport in Wellington City
Phoenix clubs (association football)
2014 establishments in New Zealand